O Lucky Man! is a 1973 British comedy-drama fantasy film directed by Lindsay Anderson, and starring Malcolm McDowell as Mick Travis, whom McDowell had first played as a disaffected public schoolboy in his first film performance in Anderson's film if.... (1968). The film was entered into the 1973 Cannes Film Festival.

Plot
The film opens with a short fragment outside the plot. Grainy, black-and-white, and silent, a title "Once Upon a Time" leads to peasant labourers in an unnamed country picking coffee beans while armed foremen push rudely between them. One worker (McDowell with black hair and moustache) pockets a few beans ("Coffee for the Breakfast Table") but is seen by a foreman. He is next seen before a fat Caucasian magistrate who slobbers as he removes his cigar only to say "Guilty." The foreman draws his machete and lays it across the unfortunate labourer's wrists, bound to a wooden block, revealing that he is to lose his hands for the theft of a few beans. The machete rises, falls, and we see McDowell draw back in a silent scream. The scene blacks out, the word NOW appears onscreen and expands quickly to fill it.

During his journey, Travis learns the lesson, reinforced by numerous songs in the soundtrack by Alan Price, that he must abandon his principles in order to succeed, but unlike the other characters he meets he must retain a detached idealism that will allow him to distance himself from the evils of the world. Initially Travis is motivated by money and material wealth. He progresses from coffee salesman (working for Imperial Coffee in the North East of England and Scotland) to a victim of torture in a government installation and a medical research subject, under the supervision of Dr. Millar.

In parallel with Travis's experiences, the film shows 1960s Britain retreating from its imperial past, but managing to retain some influence in the world by means of corrupt dealings with foreign dictators. After finding out his girlfriend is the daughter of Sir James Burgess, an evil industrialist, he is appointed Burgess' personal assistant. With Dr. Munda, the dictator of Zingara, a brutal police state which nevertheless manages to be a playground for wealthy people from the developed world, Burgess sells the regime a chemical called PL45 'Honey' for spraying on rebel areas (the effects resemble those of napalm). Burgess connives at having Travis found guilty of fraud, and he is imprisoned for five years.

The film then cuts to five years on, when Travis has finished his sentence, become a model prisoner, and converted to humanism. He is quickly faced with a bewildering series of assaults upon his new-found idealism, culminating in a scene in which he is attacked by down-and-outs whom he has been trying to help.

The final scene of the film shows him becoming involved in a casting call for a film, with Lindsay Anderson himself playing the director of the film. He is given various props to handle, including a stack of schoolbooks and a machine gun. When asked to smile Mick continually asks why. The director slaps Travis with his script book after he fails to understand what is being asked of him. After a cut to black (a device used throughout the film) a slow look of understanding crosses Mick's face. The scene then cuts to a party with dancing which includes all of the cast celebrating.

Cast
Many of the actors play several roles.

 Malcolm McDowell as Michael Arnold "Mick" Travis / Plantation thief
 Ralph Richardson as Monty / Sir James Burgess
 Rachel Roberts as Gloria Rowe / Madame Paillard / Mrs. Richards
 Arthur Lowe as Mr. Duff / Charlie Johnson / Dr. Munda
 Helen Mirren as Patricia / casting call receptionist
 Graham Crowden as Dr. Millar / Professor Stewart / Meth drinker
 Dandy Nichols as Tea lady in military installation
 Peter Jeffrey as Factory chairman / Prison governor
 Mona Washbourne as Neighbour / Usher / Sister Hallett
 Philip Stone as Jenkins / Interrogator / Salvation Army major
Mary MacLeod as Mrs. Ball / Salvationist / Vicar's wife
 Wallas Eaton as John Stone (Coffee Factory) / Col. Steiger / Prison warder / Meths drinker / Film executive
 Warren Clarke as MC at Wakefield Club / Warner / Male nurse
 Bill Owen as Superintendent Barlow / Inspector Carding
 Michael Medwin as Army captain / Power station technician / Duke of Belminster
 Vivian Pickles as Good lady
 Geoffrey Palmer as Examination doctor / Basil Keyes
 Christine Noonan as Imperial Coffee assembly line worker / Mavis at Wakefield Club
 Geoffrey Chater as Bishop / Vicar
 Anthony Nicholls as General / Judge
 James Bolam as Attenborough / Examination Doctor
 Brian Glover as Plantation foreman / Bassett (Power Station Guard)
 Brian Pettifer as Biles
 Edward Judd as Oswald
 Alan Price as himself
 Jeremy Bulloch as Crash victim / Experimental patient / Sign guy
 Ben Aris as Mr. MacIntyre / Dr. Hyder / Flight Lt. Wallace
 Margot Bennett as Coffee picker
 Anna Dawson as Becky
 Lindsay Anderson (uncredited) as Film director

Production
The film originally began as a script written by McDowell about his experiences as a coffee salesman in his late teens and early 20s. Anderson was unhappy with this treatment, and David Sherwin worked on the script. Sherwin though was undergoing personal problems at the time, which necessitated Anderson writing a few scenes himself, a skill he did not feel he had. Anderson found working with Czech cinematographer Miroslav Ondříček much less rewarding than he had on if..... He also doubted his own skills as a director during the film's making, and felt that the film had insufficient preparation. The role of Patricia was recast during production. Originally, Fiona Lewis, best known for appearing in several horror films around this time, played the role.

Britannia Hospital (1982) completes the trilogy of films featuring Mick Travis, which also sees the return of Dr. Millar.

Soundtrack

Alan Price said Lindsay Anderson wanted to make a documentary about Price and his band touring England, but the cost of licensing songs they performed was too high. As Sherwin and McDowell developed the script, Anderson decided Price should write the score and sent him the script, indicating where he would like songs to appear. Price wrote nearly all the songs before filming started. Anderson conceived of Price's role as a kind of Greek Chorus, both commenting on and finally appearing as part of the action.

The soundtrack was released as a vinyl album, by Warner Bros. Records, in 1973. In the U.S., it entered the Top LPs & Tape chart on 11 August 1973, and spent 14 weeks on the chart, peaking at no. 117.

The score won the 1974 BAFTA Award for Best Film Music.

Reviewing for Creem in 1973, Robert Christgau said, "How does an acerbic, good-humored music journeyman like Price (find: This Price is Right, on Parrot) fall in with a pompous, overfed con man like Lindsay Anderson? By playing the Acerbic, Good-Humoured Music Journeyman Symbol in a pompous, overfed movie. Two or three deft political songs do not redeem an LP that runs under 25 minutes despite filler. It figures—the movie is an hour (or three hours) too long."

Track listing
 "O Lucky Man!"
 "Poor People"
 "Sell Sell"
 "Pastoral"
 "Arrival"
 "Look Over Your Shoulder"
 "Justice"
 "My Home Town"
 "Changes"
 "O Lucky Man!"

The Song O Lucky Man has lyrics that mirror the fable from the Pasolini's film Uccellacci e uccellini – The Hawk and the Sparrows. “Takers and fakers and talkers won’t tell you. Teachers and preachers will just buy and sell you. When no one can tempt you with heaven or hell- You’ll be a lucky man!” says the bird.

The song "Changes" (based on the tune to "What a Friend We Have in Jesus") was later a chart hit for Price in April 1988 when it was used in a television advertisement of the same name for Volkswagen Golf cars in 1987, starring model Paula Hamilton. The song "Sell Sell" was recorded by Widespread Panic for their twelfth studio album Street Dogs and has been performed by the band on several occasions beginning on 19 February 2012 in Aspen, Colorado for the final night of their Wood Tour.

Charts

Reception
On Rotten Tomatoes 80% of reviews from 20 critics reviews were positive with an average rating of 7.7 out of 10.

Vincent Canby of The New York Times rated it 2 out of 4 and wrote: "Staying with it through its almost three-hour running time becomes increasingly nerve-racking, like watching superimposed images that never synchronize. The result does not match the ambition of the intention. The wit is too small, too perfunctory, for the grand plan of the film and the quality of the production itself."

Versions and home media
A number of different edits exist, with some American prints removing around twenty minutes including the working class parody suicide, just before the conclusion of the film. Even both British VHS releases delete at least one scene present in the BBC broadcast of the film (Travis testing his status in the home of his industrialist patron) in the early eighties. The original editor's cut was 183 minutes, but the distributor demanded a shorter version. The cinema release was 168 minutes, achieved by accidentally missing "roll 16" during an editing session.

A 2-disc special edition Region 1 DVD, including commentary by Malcolm McDowell, David Sherwin and Alan Price, and the feature-length documentary O Lucky Malcolm!, was released 30 October 2007.

References

External links
 
 
 
 Analysis of O Lucky Man! by Pete Hoskin

1973 films
1970s black comedy films
1970s fantasy comedy-drama films
British black comedy films
British fantasy comedy-drama films
British independent films
British satirical films
British sequel films
Films directed by Lindsay Anderson
Films set in England
Films shot in England
Films partially in color
1970s satirical films
1973 independent films
1970s English-language films
1970s British films